The Ambition of the Baron is a 1915 American silent drama film. Gloria Swanson had a bit-part role.

Cast
 Francis X. Bushman
 Beverly Bayne
 Thomas Commerford
 Lester Cuneo
 Joseph Byron Totten
 Betty Brown 
 Helen Dunbar
 Richard Travers
 Gerda Holmes
 Gloria Swanson (bit part)

References

External links

1915 films
1915 short films
American silent short films
American black-and-white films
1915 drama films
Essanay Studios films
Silent American drama films
1910s American films